The following outline is provided as an overview of and topical guide to Neptune:

Neptune – eighth and farthest known planet from the Sun in the Solar System. In the Solar System, it is the fourth-largest planet by diameter, the third-most-massive planet, and the densest giant planet. Neptune is 17 times the mass of Earth and is slightly more massive than its near-twin Uranus, which is 15 times the mass of Earth and slightly larger than Neptune. It is named after the Roman god of the sea and has the astronomical symbol ♆, a stylised version of the god Neptune's trident.

Classification of Neptune 

 Astronomical object
 Gravitationally rounded object
 Planet
 Giant planet
 Ice giant
 Planet of the Solar System
 Outer planet
 Superior planet

Location of Neptune 

 Milky Way Galaxy – barred spiral galaxy
 Orion Arm – a spiral arm of the Milky Way
 Solar System – the Sun and the objects that orbit it, including 8 planets, the eighth and furthest planet from the Sun being Neptune
 Orbit of Neptune

Movement of Neptune 

 Orbit of Neptune
 Rotation of Neptune

Features of Neptune 

 Atmosphere of Neptune
 Rings of Neptune

Natural satellites of Neptune 

 Moons of Neptune

Inner moons of Neptune 

 Naiad
 Thalassa
 Despina
 Galatea
 Larissa
 Hippocamp
 Proteus

Retrograde moons of Neptune 

 Triton
 Atmosphere of Triton
 List of geological features on Triton
 Halimede
 Psamathe
 Neso

Prograde moons of Neptune 

 Nereid
 Sao
 Laomedeia

History of Neptune 

History of Neptune
 Discovery of Neptune

Exploration of Neptune 

Exploration of Neptune

Flyby missions to explore Neptune 

 Voyager 2

Future of Neptune exploration

Proposed missions to explore Neptune 

 Interstellar Express
 Neptune Orbiter
 ODINUS
 Trident

See also 

 Outline of astronomy
 Outline of the Solar System
 Outline of space exploration

Notes

References

External links 

 NASA's Neptune fact sheet
 Neptune from Bill Arnett's nineplanets.org
 Neptune Astronomy Cast episode No. 63, includes full transcript.
 Neptune Profile at NASA's Solar System Exploration site
 Planets – Neptune A children's guide to Neptune.
 
 Neptune by amateur (The Planetary Society)

Neptune
Neptune